The 1996 Survivor Series was the 10th annual Survivor Series professional wrestling pay-per-view (PPV) event produced by the World Wrestling Federation (WWF, now WWE). It was presented by Milton Bradley's Karate Fighters, and took place on November 17, 1996, at Madison Square Garden in New York, New York. The event is notable for seeing the debut of Dwayne Johnson, who wrestled under the name of Rocky Maivia in this event, and would later become known as The Rock.

The main event was a standard wrestling match for the WWF Championship. Shawn Michaels defended the title against Sycho Sid. Sid won the title by pinning Michaels after hitting him with a television camera and performing a Powerbomb.

The undercard featured Faarooq, Vader, Razor Ramon, and Diesel versus Flash Funk, Savio Vega, and Yokozuna, Jimmy Snuka, who had been inducted into the WWF Hall Of Fame the night before, in a four-on-four Survivor Series elimination match, Bret Hart versus Stone Cold Steve Austin in a standard wrestling match to determine the number one contender to the WWF Championship, Marc Mero, Rocky Maivia, Jake Roberts, and The Stalker versus Crush, Jerry Lawler, Hunter Hearst Helmsley, and Goldust in a four-on-four Survivor Series elimination match, The Undertaker versus Mankind in a standard wrestling match and The Godwinns, Doug Furnas and Phil LaFon versus The New Rockers, Owen Hart and The British Bulldog.

Production

Background
Survivor Series is an annual gimmick pay-per-view (PPV), produced every November by the World Wrestling Federation (WWF, now WWE) since 1987. In what has become the second longest running pay-per-view event in history (behind WWE's WrestleMania), it is one of the promotion's original four pay-per-views, along with WrestleMania, SummerSlam, and Royal Rumble, and was considered one of the "Big Five" PPVs, along with King of the Ring. The event is traditionally characterized by having Survivor Series matches, which are tag team elimination matches that typically pits teams of four or five wrestlers against each other. The 1996 event was the 10th event in the Survivor Series chronology and was scheduled to be held on November 17, 1996, at Madison Square Garden in New York, New York.

Storylines
Survivor Series consisted of professional wrestling matches involving wrestlers from pre-existing feuds and storylines that played out on Monday Night Raw — WWF's primary television program. Wrestlers portrayed a hero or a villain as they followed a series of events that built tension, and culminated in a wrestling match or series of matches.

Results

Survivor Series elimination matches

Other on-screen personnel

References

Sources

hoffco-inc.com - Survivor Series '96 review
1996 Survivor Series Results

External links
Official 1996 Survivor Series website

Events in New York City
1996
Madison Square Garden
1996 in New York City
1990s in Manhattan
Professional wrestling in New York City
1996 WWF pay-per-view events
November 1996 events in the United States